The 1953 NCAA Track and Field Championships were contested June 19−20, 1953 at the 32nd annual NCAA-sanctioned track meet to determine the team and individual national champions of men's collegiate track and field in the United States. This year's events were hosted by the University of Nebraska at Memorial Stadium in Lincoln, Nebraska.

USC won their fifth consecutive team national championship, the Trojans' 17th team title in program history.

Team Result
Note: Top 10 finishers only
(H) = Hosts

See also
 NCAA Men's Outdoor Track and Field Championship
 1952 NCAA Men's Cross Country Championships

References

NCAA Men's Outdoor Track and Field Championship
1953 in sports in Nebraska
NCAA
June 1953 sports events in the United States